Mario Majstorović (born 1 March 1977 in Korneuburg) is an Austrian footballer who plays for ÖTSU Großmugl.

Club career
Late-developing Majstorović played in the Austrian lower leagues for years, before making his Austrian Football Bundesliga debut with Grazer AK at 26 years of age. In his first season with them he immediately won the Double and four years later he clinched a move to Austrian giants Austria Wien for whose youth team he had played over 10 years before.

Honours
Austrian Football Bundesliga (1):
 2004
Austrian Cup (2):
 2004, 2009

External links
 Player profile - Austria Wien
 Profile - Austria Archiv

1977 births
Living people
People from Korneuburg
Austrian footballers
SV Stockerau players
Grazer AK players
FK Austria Wien players
Favoritner AC players
Wiener Sport-Club players
Kapfenberger SV players
Austrian Football Bundesliga players
Association football defenders
Footballers from Lower Austria